The 1995 Rugby League Emerging Nations World Championship was held alongside the Centenary Rugby League World Cup. Although the competition received little build-up or promotion, the novelty value of the teams taking part encouraged relatively large crowds, and the competition was a success. A crowd of 4,147 was present at Gigg Lane, Bury for the final between the Cook Islands and Ireland.

Squads

Cook Islands 
 Managers – Paul Vaetoru, Ian Wilmott
 Coaches – Paul McGreal, Nooroa Tupa

Ireland 
 Manager Mark Casham
 Coaches Niel Wood, Terry Flanagan

Venues 
The games were played at various venues in England. The Final was played at Gigg Lane in Bury.

Group stage

Group A 

 Cook Islands advanced to the final.

Group B 

 Ireland advanced to the final.

Final

See also 
 2000 Rugby League Emerging Nations Tournament

References

External links 
 
 Rugby league Emerging Nations Tournament Official Brochure, 1995
 The Rugby League World Cup book, League Publications Ltd, 2000

1995
Emerging Nations Tournament
International rugby league competitions hosted by the United Kingdom